The 2019 season was Negeri Sembilan's 96th year in their history and 7th season in Malaysia Premier League since it was first introduced in 2004. Also it was the first season in the Malaysia Premier League following relegation 2018 season. Along with the league, the club also participated in the Malaysia FA Cup and the Malaysia Cup.

Events 
Negeri Sembilan has got a new head coach, Mat Zan Mat Aris to face the Malaysia Premier League in 2019. Negeri Sembilan has also signed several new players such as Norhafiz Zamani Misbah and Shunsuke Nakatake.

On January 22, 2019, the Negeri Sembilan Football Association (PBNS) has announced that Rhino SEA will sponsor the new kit for the Negeri Sembilan team. The club became the first team in Malaysia and Southeast Asia to collaborate with the brand.

On 15 February 2019, the club was defeated by UiTM FC at home with a heavy defeat of 4-1 in league match.

On April 2019, Negeri Sembilan FC signed new player from Brazil which is Almir on the mid-season.

On 3 August 2019, Negeri Sembilan lost to the Kedah team in the first match of the Malaysia Cup group A stage. The club lost 3-1 at Tuanku Abdul Rahman Stadium.

On 23 August 2019, the club win over Terengganu in the 2019 Malaysia Cup. The result was 3-2.

Players

Competitions

Malaysia Premier League

League table

Malaysia FA Cup

Qualified teams 
The following teams are qualified for the competition. Reserve teams are excluded.

Second round 
The draw for the second round was held on 4 March 2019 at 15:00 involving 12 teams from Liga Super, 9 teams from Liga Premier and 10 teams that progressed from first round. Fourteen matches took place from 2 to 3 April 2019. Postponed match between PDRM and Sarawak will be held on 9 April 2019. Johor Darul Ta'zim received bye into the Third Round.

Malaysia Cup

Format 
In the competition, the top eleven teams from the 2019 Malaysia Super League were joined by the top five teams from the 2019 Malaysia Premier League. The teams were drawn into four groups of four teams.

Seeding

Group stage

Group A

Statistics

Appearances and goals

|-
! colspan=14 ; text-align:center| Player(s) who left the club but featured in 2019 season

|}

References 

Negeri Sembilan FA seasons
Negeri Sembilan